Pagkatapos ng Palabas is the third studio album of the Filipino trio Apo Hiking Society. It is a 10-track album released in 1978 under JEM Records.

Track listing
"Pumapatak ang Ulan" (2:52)
"Hanggang May Pag-Ibig" (4:17)
"Lumang Tugtugin" (3:42)
"Nakapagtataka" (4:19)
"O Bumalik Ka Sana" (3:49)
"Pag-ibig" (3:12)
"Pag-ibig Mong Kay Ganda (Sana Ito'y Di Mawala)" (3:55)
"Bakit ang Babae sa Tagal ng Pagsasama (Tila Mas Mahirap Maintindihan)" (4:12)
"Kaibigan" (4:22)
"Pagkatapos ng Palabas" (4:00)

Related links
The Official Apo Hiking Society Website 

1978 albums
APO Hiking Society albums